Follow Your Heart or Fall is the third and last studio album by the Danish rock band Warm Guns, released in 1983.

Track listing

Side 1 
 "Bedtime Story" (Muhl) – 2:59 
 "I'm Just Blue" (Muhl) – 3:09
 "Love Waits for No One" (Muhl) – 3:42
 "The Girl's Not Happy" (Muhl-Hybel/Muhl) – 3:38
 "Let's Go" (Muhl-Hybel/Muhl) – 3:11

Side 2 
 "Every Teardrop Means a Lot" (Muhl) – 2:48
 "Someone Who Cares" (Muhl) – 3:56
 "The Night They Invented Champagne" (Hybel-Muhl/Muhl) – 3:40
 "The Empty Bed" (Muhl) – 3:13
 "You Can't Make It Alone" (Muhl) – 3:50

Personnel 
 Lars Muhl – vocals, keyboards
 Lars Hybel – guitar, bass on "The Girl's Not Happy"
 Kaj Weber – bass, backing vocals
 Troels Møller – drums, percussion, backing vocals

Additional musicians
 Pete Repete – keyboards
 Jeff King – backing vocals on "The Girl's Not Happy"
 Strings on "Love Waits for No One" arranged by Leif Pedersen

Production
 Warm Guns & Nils Henriksen – arrangements
 Nils Henriksen – producer 
 Flemming Rasmussen – engineer
 Ernst M. Jørgensen – supervisor
 M.T. Purse – intellectual ideas on "I'm Just Blue"
 Lars "Fawlty" Paulsen – kicks and refreshments
 Finn Bjerre – cover design
 Thorkil Gudnason – cover photos

External links 
 Discogs.com

Warm Guns albums
Vertigo Records albums
1983 albums